Discover may refer to:

Art, entertainment, and media 
 Discover (album), a Cactus Jack album
 Discover (magazine), an American science magazine

Businesses and brands 
 DISCover, the Digital Interactive Systems Corporation
 Discover Financial, an American financial services company operating Discover Bank, which offers checking accounts, credit cards, etc.
 Discover Card, a credit card brand

Science and engineering 
 DSCOVR, an Earth observation satellite

See also 
 Discovery (disambiguation)
 Discoverer (disambiguation)